is a Japanese photographer and movie director.

Awards
1968:  The 5th Taiyousho Award for The Coal Mine
1995:  The Photographic Society of Japan Annual Award and the Society of Photography Award for Infinite Embrace
1998:  The 17th Domon Ken Award for Nadya’s Village  
1998: The 8th Excellent Film Award of the Agency for Cultural Affairs for Documentary film Nadya’s Village 
2002:  The Readers’ Prize of the Berliner Zeitung and the International Cine Club Prize at the 52nd Berlin International Film Festival for Documentary film Alexei and the Spring 
2013:  The Photographic Society of Japan Award for Slaughterhouse and Ueno Station (revised edition)

Exhibitions (selected)
2002: Nadezhda - Hope The Tokyo Metropolitan Museum of Photography.
2016: Sense of Place The Izu Photo Museum, Shizuoka Prefecture.

Publications  (selected)
The Coal Mine (Kaichosha)
Circus Time& (Kawade Shobo Shinsha)
Ueno Station (Heibonsha)
Infinite Embrace (Nishida Shoten)
Nadya’s Village (Touseisha)
Alexei and the Spring&quot (Shogakukan)
A Thousand Year Song of Baobab (Heibonsha)
Performance East and West&quot (Office emu)
Slaugherhouse (Heibonsha)
People on the Seikan Ferryboat (Tsugaru Shobo) 
Sense of Place (Nohara)
Tsukiji Fish Market – A People’s Town (Asahi Shimbun Publications Inc.)

References
Nihon shashinka jiten / 328 Outstanding Japanese Photographers. Kyoto: Tankōsha, 2000. .  Despite the English-language alternative title, all in Japanese.

External links
 Motohashi Seiichi: Sense of Place | IZU PHOTO MUSEUM
 J'Lit | Authors : Seiichi Motohashi | Books from Japan 
 Polepoletimes Co., Ltd.

Japanese photographers
1940 births
Living people
Tokyo College of Photography alumni